Lancaster is the name of the following places in the U.S. state of Indiana:
Lancaster, Huntington County, Indiana
Lancaster, Jefferson County, Indiana
Patricksburg, Indiana, also called Lancaster

See also
Lancaster Park, Indiana, an unincorporated community in Monroe County
Lancaster Township, Indiana (disambiguation)
New Lancaster, Indiana, an unincorporated community in Tipton County